The Way of a Serpent, a 1982 novel by Torgny Lindgren.
The Serpent's Way, 1986 film adaption of the novel by Bo Widerberg.